Jamshed Bharucha is an Indian-American cognitive neuroscientist who has served in leadership roles in higher education. He is the Founding Vice Chancellor of Sai University, Chennai, and is a member of the Board of Advisors of India's International Movement to Unite Nations (I.I.M.U.N.).

Bharucha is President Emeritus of Cooper Union, a college located in Manhattan, New York City, having served as the 12th President of Cooper Union during the time of Cooper Union's financial crisis and tuition protests. Prior to becoming President of Cooper Union, Bharucha was Provost and Senior Vice President of Tufts University and Professor in the departments of Psychology, Music, and Neuroscience. 

Before his time at Tufts, Bharucha was the John Wentworth Professor of Psychological & Brain Sciences and Dean of the Faculty of Arts & Sciences at Dartmouth College. Bharucha was a Distinguished Fellow and Research Professor at Dartmouth College, where his research and teaching were focused on education data science.  His research is in cognitive psychology and neuroscience, focusing on the cognitive and neural basis of the perception of music. He was editor of the interdisciplinary journal Music Perception.

Early life and education
Jamshed Bharucha was born in Mumbai, India. His father Jal Bharucha, a Parsi engineer from Mumbai, and mother Elizabeth Bharucha (born Elizabeth Emily Robinson) a musician from Albany, New York, met at the University of Michigan. His parents were founding members of the Bombay International School, from which Jamshed graduated.  Bharucha studied violin in Mumbai, received an Associate’s Diploma in violin performance from Trinity College of Music (London) in 1973, and then continued to study violin at Vassar.

Bharucha graduated from Vassar College where he majored in biopsychology (1978), then received an M.A. in philosophy from Yale University (1979) and a Ph.D. in cognitive psychology from Harvard University (1983). At Harvard he worked with Stephen Kosslyn, William K. Estes and Roger Brown.

Academic and administrative career

Dartmouth College
Bharucha began his academic career at Dartmouth College, where he was  John Wentworth Professor and rose from Associate Dean for the Social Sciences to Deputy Provost to Dean of the Faculty of Arts & Sciences. He was the first Indian American dean of a school at an Ivy League institution. While in the Dartmouth administration, he established the Dartmouth Brain Imaging Center. His principal faculty appointment was in the Department of Psychological & Brain Sciences, but he also taught in the Program in Linguistics & Cognitive Science and the Program in Electroacoustic Music (now called Digital Musics).

As an academic administrator, he launched initiatives on teaching and research, as well as their integration in the form of active learning, encouraging undergraduates to get involved in research with their professors. After spending 2015-2016 at Harvard, Bharucha was appointed Distinguished Fellow at Dartmouth, where he taught in two departments: Education and Psychological & Brain Science.

Tufts University
Bharucha moved  to Tufts in 2002 to assume the position of Provost & Senior Vice President. As Provost, Bharucha was the chief academic officer of the university, overseeing the seven schools, the Tisch College, the Institute for Global Leadership, the Fares Center and the Clinical & Translational Research Institute.

Bharucha launched the Summer Scholars program, which provides opportunities for undergraduate students to work on collaborative research with faculty across the university and its affiliated hospitals. He also launched the University Seminar, a cross-disciplinary course, open to undergraduate, graduate and professional students.

Cooper Union controversy and investigation by New York state Attorney General
Bharucha was appointed as the twelfth president of The Cooper Union for the Advancement of Science and Art effective July 1, 2011. His tenure at Cooper Union was marked by a financial crisis and tuition protests. An investigation by the New York State attorney general's office ensued into the institution's decision to charge tuition for the first time in its history and other financial decisions made by the Trustees.  This eventually led to the attorney general's office brokering a settlement of a lawsuit filed by a group of students, alumni and faculty.  On June 10, 2015 five of the trustees, who had been supporters of tuition and were opponents of the settlement, resigned. The following day, Bharucha announced that he would be resigning to become a visiting scholar at Harvard University.

SRM University - Amaravati
Bharucha served as the inaugural Vice Chancellor of SRM University, Amaravati, a new university in the newly designed capital city (Amaravati) of the state of Andhra Pradesh in India. He established a partnership with  Minerva Schools at KGI to adopt their active learning  platform.

Sai University, Chennai
Bharucha serves as the Founding Vice Chancellor of Sai University, a new university being launched in the city of Chennai.

References

External links
SRM University, Amaravati
Official website
Archived messages from Cooper Union

Alumni of Trinity College of Music
Tufts University faculty
Vassar College alumni
Members of the Vassar College Board of Trustees
Harvard Graduate School of Arts and Sciences alumni
1956 births
Dartmouth College faculty
American music psychologists
Living people
Yale Graduate School of Arts and Sciences alumni
Indian emigrants to the United States
American people of Gujarati descent
Cognitive musicology
American people of Parsi descent
American Zoroastrians
Parsi people
Parsi people from Mumbai
Presidents of Cooper Union
Indian American